Los Altos (Spanish, "the heights", "the highlands", "the tall [ones]") is the name of several places, including:
 the former state of Los Altos, Central America, now divided between Guatemala and Mexico.
 the city of Los Altos, California, in the United States.
 the town of Los Altos Hills, California, United States (has been mistaken for neighboring Los Altos)
 the town of Los Altos, Tamaulipas, in Mexico.
 the town of Los Altos, Veracruz, in Mexico.
Los Altos, Province of Burgos in Castile and León, Spain.
The Los Altos (Jalisco) region in the northeastern part of the Mexican state of Jalisco
Los Altos de Chiapas, highland region of southern Mexico
Los Altos, a neighborhood in west Dallas, Texas, United States

Los Altos is the name of a few high schools in the United States:
Los Altos High School (Hacienda Heights, California)
Los Altos High School (Los Altos, California)

Los Altos is the name of a U.S. School District:
Los Altos School District